Dashtak (also known as Tāis Tāq and Tāys Dāgh) is a village in Hesar-e Valiyeasr Rural District, Central District, Avaj County, Qazvin Province, Iran. At the 2006 census, its population was 1,265, in 308 families.This village is populated by Azerbaijani Turks.

References 

Populated places in Avaj County